The Soneri Bank Limited is a Pakistani bank based in Karachi, Sindh, Pakistan. Its head office is located in the PNSC Building. It is a mid-sized bank having about over 400+ branches country-wide. Soneri Bank started its operation in the year 1992.

Products/Services

Retail Banking

Soneri Bank provides Pakistani customers a wide range of retail banking services, including current accounts, savings accounts, SME financing, Ikhtiar account, Asaan account, Basic banking account, Sahara account, Rupee term deposit account, Foreign currency account, Real time gross settlement, Youngster minor saving account, safe deposit lockers, consumer finance, Wealth management,   Agricultural financing, pensioners account, consumer finance, Bancassurance, deposit lockers, electronic banking, and SMS alert services.

Debit Cards
Corporate And Investment Banking

Soneri Bank offers the businessmen and entrepreneurs Corporate and Investment Banking based on their business's needs and required finances. In this regard, Soneri Bank offers investment banking services, cash management services, supply chain financing, working capital financing, and long-term financing.

Banking

Soneri Bank also provides Islamic banking where all the banking needs of the customers are fulfilled with Shariah-compliant solutions.

Foreign Exchange Services

With Soneri Bank's Home Remittance services, customers from across 127 cities in Pakistan can receive remittances easily, open a foreign trade account, and avail of currency exchange services from any of the 266 branches of the bank.

Supreme Prioity

Corporate social responsibility

The ideology that Soneri Bank follows is inspired by the Sun — as it shines on each and every individual, without discrimination. With their ‘Roshan Har Qadam’ scheme, Soneri Bank has taken several initiatives to empower the people of Pakistan. This year, they are focusing their efforts on the development of health, education, and community development sectors. Other initiatives include the promotion of sports, arts, and women empowerment.

Islamic Banking

Soneri Bank has recently started Islamic Banking services which include Financing products, SME banking, Safe deposit lockers.

Associated Companies

Soneri bank is associated with these companies:

 Rupali Polyester Limited
 Rupali Foods (Pvt.) Limited
 Rupafil Limited
 Rupafil PowerGen (Pvt.) Limited
 Spintex Limited
 Rupali Nylon (Pvt.) Limited

Online banking
Online banking allows customers to deposit cash, pay bills, stop payments, access account statements, funds transfer, etc.

It is one of the fastest-growing mid-sized banks of Pakistan, reaching urban and as well as rural areas of the country.

Financial Performance 

References

External links 

 Official website

Banks of Pakistan
Companies based in Karachi
Banks established in 1992
Pakistani companies established in 1992
Companies listed on the Pakistan Stock Exchange